Aniruddh Dave (born 21 July 1986) is an Indian film and television actor. Aniruddh made his debut in Imagine TV's Raajkumar Aaryyan. Later he entered Sahara One's Woh Rehne Waali Mehlon Ki to play the role of Deven. He played Rajveer in Mera Naam Karegi Roshan and was seen in Phulwa as Lakhiya. He also did a film named Tere Sang directed by Satish Kaushik. He was also seen in show Y.A.R.O Ka Tashan as Y.A.R.O, the main lead. Aniruddh Dave acted in the Hindi film Shorgul in 2016.
He was last seen playing the role of inspector Hanuman Singh in Patiala Babes.

Personal life

On 24 November 2015 Aniruddh had a love marriage with Shubhi Ahuja, an actress in Jaipur. He wore a sherwani weighing  on his wedding day.

Filmography

Movies

TV shows

Awards and nominations

References

External links

 
 
 

1986 births
Living people
Indian male television actors
Indian male soap opera actors